David Thomas Mason (born 10 May 1946) is an English singer-songwriter and guitarist from Worcester, who first found fame with the rock band Traffic. Over the course of his career, Mason has played and recorded with many notable pop and rock musicians, including Paul McCartney, George Harrison, the Rolling Stones, Jimi Hendrix, Eric Clapton, Michael Jackson, David Crosby, Graham Nash, Steve Winwood, Fleetwood Mac, Delaney & Bonnie, Leon Russell, and Cass Elliot. One of Mason's best known songs is "Feelin' Alright", recorded by Traffic in 1968 and later by many other performers, including Joe Cocker, whose version of the song was a hit in 1969. For Traffic, he also wrote "Hole in My Shoe", a psychedelic pop song that became a hit in its own right. "We Just Disagree", Mason's 1977 solo U.S. hit, written by Jim Krueger, has become a staple of U.S. classic hits and adult contemporary radio playlists.

In 2004, Mason was inducted into the Rock and Roll Hall of Fame as a founding member of Traffic. Within the same year, Mason started a new electric guitar company with business partner and industrial designer Ravi Sawhney.

Musical career

Traffic
Mason's tenure with Traffic was disjointed. He was a founding member of the group, but left following the release of their debut album, Mr. Fantasy (1967), only to rejoin halfway through the sessions for their next album, Traffic (1968), after which he left again. Last Exit (1969), a compilation of odds and ends, features little material by Mason apart from his song "Just for You". Traffic later re-formed without Mason, although he briefly began working with the band for a third time, touring with them in 1971 and playing on Welcome to the Canteen. In his brief spells with the group, Mason never quite fit in; Steve Winwood later recalled, "We all [Winwood, Jim Capaldi and Chris Wood] tended to write together, but Mason would come in with a complete song that he was going to sing and tell us all what he expected us to play. No discussion, like we were his backing group."

Session work
Mason was a friend of guitarist Jimi Hendrix, whose rock career was launched in England in 1966. Hendrix first heard the song "All Along the Watchtower", from Bob Dylan's album John Wesley Harding, with Mason at the apartment of a friend who had acquired a prior release of the album. Hendrix recorded his own version at Olympic Studios, South West London, with Mason playing 12-string acoustic guitar. The song was released on the album Electric Ladyland in September 1968. Mason also sings backing vocals on "Crosstown Traffic". When it came out as a single in October, it hit No. 5 in the UK Singles Chart and reached the Top 40 in the US. Mason later recorded his own version of the song for his 1974 album, Dave Mason, with Bob Glaub on bass.
Mason appears on the Rolling Stones' 1968 album Beggars Banquet, playing the Shehnai and bass drum on Street Fighting Man. Mason's connection was Jimmy Miller, who served as producer for the Stones and Traffic. In 1969–1970, Mason toured with Delaney and Bonnie and Friends, along with Eric Clapton and George Harrison. Mason appears on George Harrison's 1970 solo set All Things Must Pass. In 1970, Mason was slated to be the second guitarist for Derek and the Dominos. He played on their early studio sessions, including the Phil Spector production of "Tell the Truth", which was later withdrawn from sale (and is now a collectors item). He also played at their first gig at the London Lyceum but left the group soon after that. He co-wrote the song "Big Thirst" on Oh How We Danced, by Jim Capaldi (Mason's bandmate in the Hellions, Deep Feeling, and Traffic), and played the guitar solo on "Don't Be a Hero".

Solo career
After Traffic, Mason pursued a moderately successful solo career. His first single was "Just for You"; on the B-side, "Little Woman", he was backed by the band Family, following his production of Family's first album, 1968's Music in a Doll's House (which included "Never Like This", an original Mason song). Mason released an album with Cass Elliot in 1970. He finally released his first solo album in 1970 Alone Together featuring "Only You Know and I Know", which reached No. 42 on the Billboard chart, as well as the lesser hit "Look at You, Look at Me". In the early 1970s he enlisted his friend, singer-songwriter Ray Kennedy, to tour and write for his next album. In the mid- to late 1970s, he toured and recorded with guitarist Jim Krueger, keyboardist Mike Finnigan, bassist Gerald Johnson and drummer Rick Jaeger. Mason followed up with the album, Let It Flow, released in April 1977. The album peaked at only No. 37, but was in the charts for 49 weeks and went platinum as a result carried by the success of the album single "We Just Disagree", which was written by Mason's backup guitarist, Jim Krueger.  The single topped at  #12, and other album singles "So High (Rock Me Baby and Roll Me Away)" and "Let It Go, Let It Flow" also charted in the U.S. Mason's next album was Mariposa de Oro, released in 1978. The album contained a  cover of "Will You Still Love Me Tomorrow," which became a Top 40 single; the album itself reached number 41 and went gold. Mason played himself in the film Skatetown, U.S.A., performing two songs in a roller disco as well as writing and performing the film's theme song.

In 1980 Mason released Old Crest on a New Wave; the album stalled at number 74 and had one single make the charts, "Save Me." This failure of the album resulted in Mason leaving his label Columbia. Mason struggled to attract another major label but continued to tour in an acoustic duo with Krueger. In 1987, he released two albums, Some Assembly Required on the Canadian label Maze Records and Two Hearts on MCA Records; the latter album featured the single "Dreams I Dream," a duet with Phoebe Snow that reached number 11 in the adult contemporary charts.

In 1997, Mason was scheduled to be a member of Ringo Starr & His All-Starr Band, performing "Only You Know and I Know," "We Just Disagree" and "Feelin' Alright," but he was dropped from rehearsals before the tour started.

In 1998, Mason reunited with his former Traffic bandmate Jim Capaldi for The 40,000 Headmen Tour; a live album followed the tour. In 2002, he released the DVD Dave Mason: Live at Sunrise, a recording of a live performance at the Sunrise Musical Theater in Sunrise, Florida, backed by Bobby Scumaci on keyboards, Johnne Sambataro on rhythm guitar (who rejoined Mason for the DVD, after previously touring with him in 1978), John Lundahl on rhythm guitar, Richard Campbell on bass and Greg Babcock on drums. In 2008 Mason released his first studio album in more than 20 years, titled 26 Letters 12 Notes.  He followed up with another album in 2014 called Future's Past.

As of 2018, Mason was continuing to perform in the US, including a 2018 tour with Steve Cropper.

Tenure in Fleetwood Mac
For a brief period in the mid-1990s, Mason joined Fleetwood Mac and released the album Time with them in 1995. He toured with them over the course of 1994–95, including opening for REO Speedwagon and Crosby, Stills & Nash.

Mason was never entirely comfortable during his time in Fleetwood Mac. He has said several times since leaving the band: "Being one of two and at times three guitarists to replace Lindsey Buckingham says more about Buckingham's genius than my guitar playing".

Personal life 

Mason moved permanently to the United States in 1971, and lived in the Ojai Valley in California for 16 years. As of September 2017 he had homes in Carson City, Nevada and Hawaii.

Philanthropy
Mason is a proponent of music education for children. In 2005, he signed on as an official supporter of Little Kids Rock, a non-profit organisation that provides free musical instruments and lessons to children in American public schools. He sits on the organization's board of directors as an honorary member.

Mason also is a founding board member of Yoga Blue, a non-profit organisation devoted to teaching yoga and other holistic practices to those recovering from substance abuse and other self-destructive disorders.

Mason and his longtime friend Ted Knapp have founded Rock Our Vets, an all-volunteer 501(c)3 charity supported by many other musicians, helping military veterans and the families of law enforcement and firefighters who lost their lives in the line of duty. The charity has focused on providing food and clothing to homeless veterans, laptop computers for veterans aspiring to continue their education, as well as suicide prevention.

Discography

Solo

Studio albums

Live albums
1973: Dave Mason Is Alive (ABC/Blue Thumb/MCA) (recorded at the Troubadour, West Hollywood, CA, 1971) – US #116
1976: Certified Live (Columbia) (recorded on tour, 1975) – US #78
1999: Live: The 40,000 Headmen Tour (with Jim Capaldi) (Receiver Records) (recorded at various locations, Feb-April 1998)
2002: Live at Perkins Palace (Pioneer) (recorded 1981)
2002: Dave Mason: Live at Sunrise (Image Entertainment)
2004: XM Radio (Barham Productions) (recorded May 2003)
Reissued with bonus tracks in 2007 as Dave Mason Live at XM Satellite Radio (Friday Music)
2015: Traffic Jam (Barham Productions)

Compilation albums
1972: Scrapbook (Island Records)
1974: The Best of Dave Mason (Blue Thumb) – US #183
1974: At His Best (ABC Records) – US #133
1978: The Very Best of Dave Mason (ABC/Blue Thumb) – US #179
1978: Skatetown, U.S.A. (Columbia) 
soundtrack to the film of the same name; Mason performs "Main Theme", "I Fell in Love", and "Feelin' Alright"
1978: California Jam II (Columbia) 
recorded live at the music festival of the same name; Mason performs "Let it Go, Let it Flow" and "We Just Disagree"
1981: The Best of Dave Mason (Columbia)
1995: Long Lost Friend: The Best of Dave Mason (Legacy Recordings/Columbia)
1999: The Ultimate Collection (Hip-O Records)
2000: Super Hits (Legacy)
2007: The Definitive Collection (Hip-O)
2014: The Columbia Years: The Definitive Anthology (Real Gone Music)

Singles
 1968 "Just for You" b/w "Little Woman"
 1970 "Only You Know and I Know" – US #42
 1970 "Satin Red and Black Velvet Woman" – US #97 (was only a 45 rpm until it was released on the Ultimate Collection CD in 1999)
 1972 "To Be Free" – US #121
 1977 "So High (Rock Me Baby and Roll Me Away)" — US Billboard #89, Cash Box #69
 1977 "We Just Disagree" – US #12, US AC #19
 1978 "Mystic Traveller"
 1978 "Don't It Make You Wonder"
 1978 "Let It Go, Let It Flow" – US #45
 1978 "Will You Still Love Me Tomorrow?" – US #39
 1980 "Save Me" (with Michael Jackson) – US #71
 1987 "Something In The Heart" – US Mainstream Rock #24
 1988 "Dreams I Dream" (duet with Phoebe Snow) – US AC #11

Videos
 1981: Live at Perkins Palace (Pioneer, laser disc)
 1992: Best Live 1991 Tokyo (Bandai, laser disc)
 2002: Live at Sunrise (Image Entertainment, DVD)
 2008: The Legendary Guitar of Dave Mason (Hot Licks, instructional DVD)

Traffic
See Traffic discography

Session work
1967: Julian Covey & The Machine, "A Little Bit Hurt" / "Sweet Bacon" single (Philips)
guitar and vocals
 1968: Family, Music in a Doll's House 
 producer, songwriter of "Never Like This"
1968: The Jimi Hendrix Experience, Electric Ladyland (Reprise) 
acoustic guitar on "All Along the Watchtower", backing vocals on "Crosstown Traffic"
 1968: The Rolling Stones, Beggar's Banquet (Decca) 
 shehnai on "Street Fighting Man" and mellotron on "Factory Girl"
 1969: Gordon Jackson, Thinking Back (Marmalade)
 producer, bass guitar, electric guitar, and slide guitar
 1969: Merryweather, Word of Mouth (Capitol)
 songwriter, guitar, bass, and vocals
 1970: Delaney & Bonnie & Friends with Eric Clapton, On Tour
 guitar
 1970: George Harrison, All Things Must Pass (Apple)
guitar on various tracks
 
 1970: Bobby Lester, Bobby Lester (Columbia)
 guitar on "Freedom"
 1971: Delaney & Bonnie & Friends, Motel Shot (ATCO)
 guitar and vocals
 1971: Graham Nash, Songs for Beginners (Atlantic)
 electric guitar on "Military Madness"
 1972: Jim Capaldi, Oh How We Danced (Island)
 harmonica on "Big Thirst", guitar on "Don't Be a Hero"
 1972: Crosby and Nash, Graham Nash / David Crosby (Atlantic)
 lead guitar on "Immigration Man"
 1972: Bobby Keys, Bobby Keys (Warner Bros.) 
 songwriter on "Steal from a King" and "Crispy Duck"
 1973: David Blue, Nice Baby and the Angel (Asylum)
 acoustic guitar, electric guitar, and vocals on "Outlaw Man"
 1973: Graham Nash, Wild Tales (Atlantic)
 12-string guitar on "Oh! Camil (The Winter Soldier)"
 1974: Phoebe Snow, Phoebe Snow (Shelter Records)
 electric guitar on "No Show Tonight"
 1975: Wings, Venus and Mars
 electric guitar on "Listen to What the Man Said"
 1978: Mike Finnigan, Black and White (Columbia)
 lead guitar on "Hideaway From Love"
 1978: Stephen Stills, Thoroughfare Gap (Columbia)
 vocals on "You Can't Dance Alone", "We Will Go On", "What's the Game", and "Midnight Rider"
 1979: Ron Wood, Gimme Some Neck (CBS)
 acoustic guitar on "F.U.C. Her"
 1983: Donovan, Lady of the Stars
 guitar on "Boy for Every Girl"
 1983: Don Felder, Airborn (Asylum)
 vocals on "Never Surrender"
 1988: Eric Clapton, Crossroads (Polydor) 
 guitar on "Ain't That Loving You", originally recorded ca. 1974
 1995: Fleetwood Mac, Time (Warner Bros. Records)
 songwriter, producer, vocals, and guitar
 2004: Noel Redding, The Experience Sessions (Sony/BMG)
 sitar on "There Ain't Nothing Wrong", originally recorded ca. 1968
 2010: Jimi Hendrix, West Coast Seattle Boy (Legacy) 
 sitar on "Little One", originally recorded ca. 1968
 2011: Derek and the Dominoes, Layla and Other Assorted Love Songs: 40th Anniversary Edition (Universal)
 guitar and vocals on "Roll It Over", originally recorded June 1970

References

External links

Rock Our Vets official website (archived)
NAMM Oral History Interview February 23, 2007

1946 births
Living people
20th-century English musicians
21st-century English musicians
English songwriters
English male singers
English rock guitarists
British soft rock musicians
Island Records artists
Columbia Records artists
MCA Records artists
Atlantic Records artists
Blue Thumb Records artists
Delaney & Bonnie & Friends members
Fleetwood Mac members
Traffic (band) members
Musicians from Worcester, England
Harvest Records artists
English male guitarists
English expatriates in the United States